Classic Blue is the fourth solo studio album by The Moody Blues member Justin Hayward.  Classic Blue was released in 1989 by Trax Music (later re-released on Castle Music Records in 1994), and features Mike Batt, who also produced the album, and the London Philharmonic Orchestra.  The album includes cover versions of many hit songs, such as The Beatles' "Blackbird", and Led Zeppelin's "Stairway to Heaven."  It also includes a re-recorded version of "Forever Autumn," a song from Jeff Wayne's Musical Version of The War of the Worlds, in which Hayward originally sang lead vocals.

Track listing
 "The Tracks of My Tears" (Smokey Robinson, Marv Tarplin, Warren Moore)– 3:23
 "MacArthur Park" (Jimmy Webb) – 7:16
 "Blackbird" (John Lennon, Paul McCartney) – 2:31
 "Vincent" (Don McLean) – 4:53
 "God Only Knows" (Brian Wilson, Tony Asher) – 3:34
 "Bright Eyes" (Mike Batt) – 3:53
 "A Whiter Shade of Pale" (Keith Reid, Gary Brooker) – 4:28
 "Scarborough Fair" (Traditional; arranged by Paul Simon, Art Garfunkel) – 4:18
 "Railway Hotel" (Mike Batt) – 3:23
 "Man of the World" (Peter Green) – 3:29
 "Forever Autumn" (Paul Vigrass, Gary Osborne, Jeff Wayne) – 5:15
 "As Long As the Moon Can Shine" (Mike Batt) – 4:20
 "Stairway to Heaven" (Jimmy Page, Robert Plant) – 7:42

Charts

References

1989 albums
Justin Hayward albums
Covers albums
Albums produced by Mike Batt